The Curse of Audrey Earnshaw (released as Blood Harvest in the United Kingdom) is a 2020 Canadian supernatural horror film written and directed by Thomas Robert Lee. It stars Catherine Walker, Jessica Reynolds, Jared Abrahamson and Sean McGinley. The film tells the story of a mother and daughter living in a village, who come under suspicion of witchcraft from the other villagers after a plague decimates their crops and livestock.

The film premiered at the Fantasia International Film Festival on 22 August 2020. It was released in the United States by Epic Pictures on 2 October 2020, in Canada by A71 Entertainment on 9 October 2020, and in the United Kingdom on 16 November 2020. It received overall positive reviews from critics, with praise directed at the film's atmosphere and the cast's performances, though it was criticized for its story.

Cast 

 Catherine Walker as Agatha Earnshaw
 Jessica Reynolds as Audrey Earnshaw
 Jared Abrahamson as Colm Dwyer
 Hannah Emily Anderson as Bridget Dwyer
 Sean McGinley as Seamus Dwyer
 Don McKellar as Bernard Buckley
 Geraldine O'Rawe as Deirdre Buckley

Production 
Filming was initially planned to take place in Ireland, but after part of the funding fell through, the producers decided to film instead at the CL Ranch, west of Calgary, Alberta.

Release 
The film had its world premiere at the Fantasia International Film Festival in Montreal on 22 August 2020. The film was released by Epic Pictures in the United States on 2 October 2020, and by A71 Entertainment in Canada on 9 October 2020. It was released digitally in the United Kingdom under the title of Blood Harvest on 16 November 2020.

Reception 
The film received overall positive reviews from critics. The site's critics' consensus reads: "The Curse of Audrey Earnshaw compensates for a certain amount of frustrating narrative drift with solid performances and a strong command of mood."

Leslie Felperin of The Guardian gave the film a score of 3 out of 5 stars, saying that it "simmers with unease and lingers in the mind – but bites off more than it can chew, leaving a little too much undigested narrative", but added that the cast's performances give the film "a charming luridness that could generate a small cult following." Alex Saveliev of Film Threat wrote: "With The Curse of Audrey Earnshaw, Lee has created a cinematic microcosm – atmospheric, containing powerful scenes, driven by some committed performances – that forgets to make a coherent point. The titular curse seems to be that of narrative ambiguity."

John DeFore of The Hollywood Reporter wrote that the film "hits some notes well but never really generates an overall sense of dread", adding that "Lee's sometimes awkward script devotes more attention than it probably should to the suffering of individual families", though he praised the cast's performances. He concluded: "Nick Thomas' attractive compositions and strong design work overall help give the film a credible sense of place, but ultimately this haunting lacks soul."

References

External links 
 
 The Curse of Audrey Earnshaw at Library and Archives Canada

2020 films
2020 horror films
Canadian supernatural horror films
English-language Canadian films
Films set in 1973
2020s English-language films
2020s supernatural horror films
2020s Canadian films